Erpland is the second studio album by British psychedelic rock band Ozric Tentacles. It was originally released on 25 June 1990 on Dovetail Records, with a digitally remastered CD/DVD release on 6 February 2017 through Snapper Music's Madfish label.

Track listing

Live at the Fridge DVD 
The remastered version of Erpland contains a live DVD of the band playing at The Fridge in Brixton, UK on 19 May 1991. The original tapes had been lost for ten years, despite bootleg VHS copies—with the appearance of an official release—in circulation. The original tapes were rediscovered in 2001.

Credits 
Ed Wynne – guitar, synthesizers, production
Paul Hankin – percussion
Mervin Pepler – drums
John Egan – flute, voice
Roly Wynne – bass
Joie Hinton – synthesizer, sampling
Marcus C. Diess – ethnic percussion
Tom Brooks – reggae bubbles
Generator John – tea, tambourine
Steve Everitt – sampling

Notes
"Iscence" is one of very few songs by Ozric Tentacles to make use of noticeable vocals.

A live version of "The Throbbe", entitled "Live Throbbe", appears on Strangeitude and on the "Sploosh!" single.

The owner of the studio at which the album was recorded allegedly told the band, "Right, you know how the studio works. Here's the keys, I'll see you in a few days."

The last track of the album, A Gift of Wings, was written and recorded whilst the band was under the influence of psilocybin mushrooms. Ed Wynne claims most of the album was recorded this way.

References

1990 albums
Ozric Tentacles albums